Johnson Village is an unincorporated community and a census-designated place (CDP) located in and governed by Chaffee County, Colorado, United States. The population of the Johnson Village CDP was 246 at the United States Census 2010. The Buena Vista post office (Zip Code 81211) serves the area.

Geography
Johnson Village is located along the west side of the Arkansas River, where the river is bridged by U.S. Highway 24. It is approximately three miles south of the town of Buena Vista. The community consists largely of a strip of retail establishments along either side of U.S. Highway 24, on the west side of Trout Creek Pass. The economy of the town is based largely on pass-through traffic, including tourism, in particular whitewater rafting on the Arkansas River.

Demographics

See also

Outline of Colorado
Index of Colorado-related articles
State of Colorado
Colorado cities and towns
Colorado census designated places
Colorado counties
Chaffee County, Colorado
Arkansas Headwaters Recreation Area
Browns Canyon National Monument
Cottonwood Pass
Trout Creek Pass

References

External links

Johnson Village @ UncoverColorado.com
Arkansas Headwaters Recreation Area
Johnson Village & Champion State Wildlife Areas
Chaffee County website

Census-designated places in Chaffee County, Colorado
Census-designated places in Colorado
Colorado populated places on the Arkansas River